Laura Paris (born 7 September 2002) is an Italian group rhythmic gymnast. She is the 2021 World Group All-around silver medalist and the 2022 European Group All-around silver medalist.

Career

Senior
In her first senior year, she joined Italian National reserve group and was part of it until 2021, when she replaced injured Letizia Cicconcelli in main group. She made her senior international debut in May that year, at the 2021 Baku World Cup where her group won silver medal in Group All-around and both Apparatus finals. Then they competed at the 2021 Pesaro World Cup and placed 5th in Group All-around. Next day, they won gold medals in both Apparatus finals. She competed at the 2021 World Champinoships in Kitakyushu, Japan, and won silver medal in Group All-around.

Personal life
Her father Federico Paris competed in track cycling at international level. He claimed victory in tandem at the World Championships in 1990, 1992 and 1993. She has one sister Francesca, born in 1999.

References

External links 
 
 

2002 births
Living people
Italian rhythmic gymnasts
Medalists at the Rhythmic Gymnastics European Championships
21st-century Italian women